The 2021–22 Butler Bulldogs men's basketball team represented Butler University in the 2021–22 NCAA Division I men's basketball season. They were coached by LaVall Jordan, in his fifth year as head coach of his alma mater. The Bulldogs played their home games at Hinkle Fieldhouse in Indianapolis, Indiana as members of the Big East Conference. They finished the season 14–19, 6–14 in Big East play to finish in ninth place. They defeated Xavier in the first round of the Big East tournament before losing to Providence in the quarterfinals. 

On April 1, 2022, the school fired head coach LaVall Jordan. Two days later, the school named Thad Matta the team's new head coach. Matta previously was the head coach at Ohio State and Xavier and was the head coach at Butler for the 2000–01 season.

Previous season
In a season limited due to the ongoing COVID-19 pandemic, the Bulldogs finished the 2020–21 season 10–15, 8–12 to finish in 10th place in Big East play. In the Big East tournament, they defeated Xavier in the first round before losing to Creighton in the quarterfinals.

Offseason

Departures

Incoming transfers

Recruiting classes

2021 recruiting class

2022 recruiting class

Roster

Schedule and results
 
|-
!colspan=9 style=|Exhibition
|-

|-
!colspan=9 style=|Non-conference regular season
|-

|-
!colspan=9 style=|Big East regular season
|-

|-
!colspan=9 style="|Big East tournament

Rankings

*AP does not release post-NCAA tournament rankings.

Awards

References

Butler
Butler Bulldogs men's basketball seasons
Butler
Butler